is a railway station in the city of Kasugai, Aichi Prefecture,  Japan, operated by Meitetsu.

Lines

Station layout
The station has two opposed side platforms connected by a footbridge. The station has automated ticket machines, Manaca automated turnstiles and is unattended..

Platforms

Adjacent stations

|-
!colspan=5|Nagoya Railroad

Station history
Manai Station was opened on February 11, 1931. The station was closed in 1944 and reopened on November 24, 1947.

Passenger statistics
In fiscal 2017, the station was used by an average of 2617 passengers daily.

Surrounding area
Myoraku-ji
Hachiman Jinja
Myozo-ji

See also
 List of Railway Stations in Japan

References

External links

 Official web page 

Railway stations in Japan opened in 1931
Railway stations in Aichi Prefecture
Stations of Nagoya Railroad
Kasugai, Aichi